Eva Orsmond (born 13 March 1966) is a weight loss expert born in Finland but based in Ireland since moving there in 2000.

Career
Orsmond qualified in medicine at Pavia University in 1990, then trained in public health at the Nordiska högskolan för folkhälsovetenskap in Gothenburg. She worked in Bangladesh, Finland and Namibia before moving to Ireland in 2000.

Orsmond owns four Orsmond Clinics around Ireland, which she set up in 2001. Orsmond has appeared on Off the Rails, The Big Bite, Prime Time, The Late Late Show, Saturday Night Show, Meet the Family, Corrigan Knows Food,  Claire Byrne Live, The Nolan Show, The Ray D'arcy Show and was a medical consultant on the RTÉ weight loss show Operation Transformation, which she quit in October 2015.

In January 2016, Eva Orsmond presented Sugar Crash an RTÉ documentary about sugar consumption and health issues of the Irish population. She has also appeared in The Restaurant. In 2017, she appeared on the first season of the Irish version of Dancing with the Stars.

Views
 Orsmond stated that "pregnant women allowing themselves to be overweight is criminal". These comments drew objections from a number of obesity experts, published in an open letter.
 Orsmond has said in interviews that there's nothing wrong with women aspiring to have the body of a Victoria's Secret model.
 She revealed in a 2015 interview that she has taken up pole dancing to help keep fit.
 Orsmond has said that children should be weighed in school to help tackle Ireland’s obesity crisis.
 She doesn't believe that a sugar tax would stop people from eating sugar.
 She believes that Ireland has a major poverty problem (especially in South Dublin) and that measures has to be taken in order to fix it.

Personal life
In 1995, Orsmond married South African Wyatt Orsmond with whom she has two children. She lived in Cape Town, South Africa, for five years before moving to Ireland in 2000.

References

External links
Orsmond Clinics
twitter

Finnish public health doctors
Living people
1966 births
Finnish women physicians
Irish people in health professions
University of Pavia alumni
21st-century Finnish physicians
Finnish expatriates in Bangladesh
Finnish expatriates in Ireland
Finnish expatriates in Namibia
Finnish expatriates in South Africa
Women public health doctors